Dental avulsion is the complete displacement of a tooth from its socket in alveolar bone owing to trauma. Normally, a tooth is connected to the socket by the periodontal ligament. When a tooth is knocked out, the ligament is torn.

Avulsed permanent teeth may be replanted, i.e., returned to the socket. Deciduous teeth are not replanted because of  the risk of damaging the permanent tooth germ. Immediate replantation is considered ideal, but this may not be possible if the patient suffered other serious injuries. If properly preserved, teeth may be replanted up to one hour after avulsion. The success of delayed replantation depends on the survival of the cells remaining on the root surface. Storage in an environment similar to the tooth socket can protect these cells until the operation.

Prevention

Contact sports carry a significant risk of dental injury, which can be reduced by wearing a mouthguard or helmet. Mouthguards are often less effective if not fitted properly to the wearer.

Despite their wide availability, the use of mouthguards is relatively uncommon. Many people do not use them even in situations that carry a high risk of dental injury, or when their use is mandated. In addition, mouthguards may be dislodged from the wearer's mouth, leaving the teeth unprotected.

Certain occlusal traits, such as class II malocclusions and increased overjet, are associated with a higher incidence of dental trauma. These traits can be corrected by an orthodontist.

Risk factors 

 Postnormal occlusion
 An over-jet exceeding 4 mm
 Short upper lip
 Incompetent lips
 Mouth breathing

Management

Dental avulsion is a real dental emergency in which prompt management (within 20–40 minutes of injury) affects the prognosis of the tooth. The avulsed permanent tooth should be gently but well rinsed with saline, with care taken not to damage the surface of the root which may have living periodontal fiber and cells. Once the tooth and mouth are clean an attempt can be made to re-plant in its original socket within the alveolar bone and later splinted by a dentist for several weeks. Failure to re-plant the avulsed tooth within the first 40 minutes after the injury may result in a less favorable prognosis for the tooth. If the tooth cannot be immediately replaced in its socket, follow the directions for Treatment of knocked-out (avulsed) teeth and cold milk or saliva and take it to an emergency room or a dentist. If the mouth is sore or injured, cleansing of the wound may be necessary, along with stitches, local anesthesia, and an update of tetanus immunization if the mouth was contaminated with soil. Management of injured primary teeth differs from management of permanent teeth; avulsed primary tooth should not be re-planted (to avoid damage to the permanent dental crypt).

Although some dentists advise that the best treatment for an avulsed tooth is immediate replantation, for a variety of reasons this can be difficult for the non-professional person. The teeth are often covered with debris. This debris must be washed off with a physiological solution and not scrubbed. Often multiple teeth are knocked-out and the person will not know which socket an individual tooth belongs to. The injured victim may have other more serious injuries that require more immediate attention or injuries such as a severely lacerated bleeding lip or gum that prevent easy visualization of the socket. Pain may be severe, and the person may resist replantation of the teeth. People may, in light of infectious diseases (e.g., HIV), fear handling the teeth or touching the blood associated with them. If immediate replantation is not possible, the teeth should be placed in an appropriate storage solution and brought to a dentist who can then replant them. The dentist will clean the socket, wash the teeth if necessary, and replant them into their sockets. He will splint them to non-knocked-out teeth for a maximum of two weeks for teeth with normal alveolar process and bone support. Properly handled, even replantation of periodontally compromised permanent teeth in older patients under good maintenance have been reported, with splinting extending for over 4 weeks due to the reduced support structure for the root due to periodontal disease.  One week to ten days after the replantation, the dental pulps of the replanted teeth should be removed and a root canal treatment completed within two months.

In addition, as recommended in all dental traumas good oral hygiene with 0.12% chlorhexidine gluconate mouthwash, a soft and cold diet, and avoidance of smoking for several days may provide a favorable condition for periodontal ligaments regeneration.

Initial assessment 
When a patient arrives at the Dentist they should be seen quickly and with urgency. If the tooth has not been placed in a suitable storage medium, the Dentist should do this immediately. A thorough extra oral and intra-oral examination should be performed. The clinician should consider the age of the patient, the history of the injury and that it is in line with clinical findings. If there is concern about non-accidental injury, then safeguarding procedures should be followed.

Re-implantation 
Prior to the beginning of the procedure, a local anesthetic should be administered to both the palatal/lingual tissues to minimize discomfort. Gentle Irrigation with a saline solution should be performed as this removes any clots within the socket, which could prevent the proper re-positioning of the tooth into its original position. The tooth should always be handled via the enamel on the crown, not the root! Wash the root surface with saline, be careful not to scrub the root surface, as this may crush the delicate cells. Any stubborn debris can be removed by 'gently dabbing with gauze soaked in saline'. The tooth may then be gently placed back into the socket.

Soaking is the practice of soaking the tooth in an active medicament before re-implantation. It has been shown that soaking the avulsed tooth in an immune-modulating drug prior to re-implantation can increase periodontal healing and tooth survival, compared to a saline control.

Biologic basis for success of replantation following avulsion
Every tooth is connected to its surrounding bone by the periodontal ligament. The tooth receives its nourishment through this ligament. When a tooth is knocked out, this ligament is stretched and splits in half, half stays on the tooth root and half stays on the socket wall. If these two halves can be kept alive, the tooth can be replanted, and the halves of the ligament will reattach, and the tooth will remain vital. The half that stays on the socket wall, since it remains connected to the bone blood supply, is naturally kept alive. However, the ligament cells that remain on the tooth root lose their blood and nutrition supply and must be artificially maintained. They must be protected from two potentially destructive processes: cell crushing and loss of normal cell metabolism. All treatment between the time of the accident and the ultimate replantation must be focused on preventing these two possibilities.

Prevention of cell crushing
When teeth are knocked out, they end up on an artificial surface: the floor, the ground or material such as carpeting. If the surface is hard, the tooth root cells will be traumatized. Since the cells remaining on the tooth root are very delicate, additional trauma to the tooth root cells must be avoided so as to avoid more tooth root cell crushing. This damage can occur while picking the tooth up and/or during transportation to the dentist.

When a tooth is picked up, it should always be grasped by the enamel on the crown. Finger pressure on the tooth root cells will cause cell crushing. Any attempt to clean off any debris should be avoided. Debris should always be washed off gently with, at the very least, a physiologic saline. Even with the use of a physiologic saline, the “scrubbing” of the tooth root to remove debris must be avoided. When placed in a physiologic solution, the tooth should be gently agitated to permit the cleansing of the tooth root. At the same time that this agitation occurs, the bumping of the tooth root against a hard surface such as glass, plastic or even cardboard must also be avoided. For the same reasons, the method in which the knocked-out teeth are transported must be carefully selected. Placing the knocked-out teeth in transporting vehicles such as tissues and handkerchiefs can be damaging and transporting them in glass or cardboard containers can also be potentially damaging to the cells. In addition to the potential damage that the hard surface can cause, glass containers have the added possibility of breakage or leakage of the physiologic storage fluid. If the glass container does not have a tightly fitting top, then during the transportation, the physiologic storage solution can spill out and the teeth can fall, once again, on the floor and, at the same time, be out of a physiologic environment.

Maintenance of normal cell metabolism
Normally metabolizing tooth root cells have an internal cell pressure (osmolality) of 280-300 mOs and a pH of 7.2. When there is an uninterrupted blood supply, all of the metabolites (calcium, phosphate, potassium) and glucose that the cells require are provided. When the tooth is knocked out, this normal blood supply is cut off and within 15 minutes most of the stored metabolites have been depleted and the cells will begin to die. Within one to two hours, enough cells will die that rejection of the tooth by the body at a later time is the usual outcome. The method by which the body rejects the replanted tooth is a process called “replacement root resorption”. During this process, the tooth root cells become necrotic (dead) and will activate the immunologic mechanism of the body to attempt to remove this necrotic layer and literally eats away the tooth root. This is called “root resorption” It is a slow, but non-painful, process that is sometimes not observed by x-rays for years. Once this process starts, it is irreversible, and the tooth will eventually fall out. In growing children, this can cause bone development problems because the replacement resorption (also termed ankylosis) attaches the tooth firmly to the jawbone and stops normal tooth eruption and impedes normal jaw growth.

Research has shown that the critical factor for reduction of the death of the tooth root cells and the subsequent root replacement resorption following reimplantation of knocked-out teeth is maintenance of normal cell physiology and metabolism of the cells left on the tooth root while the tooth is out of the socket. In order to maintain this normalcy, the environment in which the teeth are stored must supply the optimum internal cell pressure, cell nutrients and pH.

Storage media
There are many storage media available for knocked-out tooth storage. The most often recommended are: saliva, physiologic saline, milk and pH balanced cell preserving fluids. Water and ice have been shown to damage the tooth root cells, and as such, avulsed teeth should never be stored in them. The osmolality and pH of water and ice is very low (7-17mOs) compared to normal cell pressure (280 mOs). When a knocked-out tooth is placed in water, the cells attempt to equalize with the surrounding environment, the cell fluid tries to move to the outside pressure environment and burst. Water with table salt in it is damaging to the knocked-out teeth.

Saliva, that is placing the tooth under the accident victim’s tongue or in the cheek, has been recommended. Saliva, as a storage media, causes twice damage as water. Its osmolality is very low, causing bursting of the tooth root cells, but additionally, because saliva is filled with its normal flora of microorganisms, it will severely infect the tooth root cells. When the tooth is replanted, not only will the cells be necrotic, but they will also infect the bone socket.
Physiologic saline has a fairly compatible osmolality and will not cause cell swelling, but it lacks the metabolites and glucose necessary for maintenance of normal cell metabolism.

Milk has been also recommended as a storage medium for avulsed teeth. Its advantage is the high availability of fresh whole milk. Only whole milk can be used for tooth preservation. Skim milk and heavy cream do not have the correct fluid pressure and will cause damage to the root cells. Milk has no observed regenerative properties for cells on knocked out teeth.

It was discovered 30 years ago that milk was less damaging to knocked out teeth than water or saliva. It was recommended because it has a compatible osmolality (fluid pressure) to tooth root cells, and it is thought to be readily available. However, like physiologic saline, milk lacks the necessary metabolites and glucose necessary to maintain normal cell metabolism of the tooth root cells. The cells on knocked-out tooth roots in milk do not die immediately but are unable to replicate (mitosis) and so are less able to reform new cells when replanted.

The most optimum storage media that are available have been shown to be pH balanced cell preserving solutions. The best known and most extensively tested is called Hank’s Balanced Salt Solution (HBSS). It has all of the metabolites such as Ca, phosphate ions, K+ and glucose that are necessary to maintain normal cell metabolism for long periods of time. HBSS has been extensively tested in dental and medical research for the past twenty years. This research has shown that 90% of cells stored in HBSS for 24 hours maintain their normal viability and after four days, still have 70%viable. In research studies, extracted dog’s teeth that have been placed in HBSS for four days can still be replanted with little signs of resorption.

HBSS also has been shown to be capable of replacing lost cell metabolites. Since a cell that has been cut off from its blood supply depletes its stored metabolites after fifteen minutes, a tooth that has been extra-oral for one hour has less vital cells to reconnect with the bone ligament cells.

Some studies in dental research have shown that knocked out teeth that have been dry for up to one hour will have less resorption if they are soaked in a HBSS for 30 minutes prior to replantation. In these studies, dog’s teeth were extracted and left dry for 30, 45 and 60 minutes and then soaked in HBSS for 30 minutes and then reimplanted. These teeth showed 50% less replacement resorption following reimplantation. It has also been shown that keeping the teeth cold while in the HBSS does not affect success.

Many other types of storage liquids have been tested such as powdered milk, Enfamil, Gatorade, and contact lens solution. All of them have been shown to either be ineffective or damaging to avulsed tooth.

Prognosis
Despite the treatment provided, dental avulsion carries one of the poorest outcomes with 73-96% of the replanted teeth eventually being lost. There are three main factors which significantly influence the prognosis of the tooth. These include:

 The extent of damage to the periodontal ligament (PDL) at the time of injury
 The storage conditions of the avulsed tooth
 The duration prior to replantation 

Dental trauma varies widely in complexity and usually there is little that lay people or professionals (excluding dentists) can do. However, avulsion is the one type of traumatic dental injury where lay people can play a critical role in determining the prognosis of the tooth. The tooth has the best prognosis if it is replanted within 15 minutes of the accident  but also has an excellent prognosis if it has been stored in an optimal storage medium within one hour of the accident.

PDL healing is the primary outcome measure when assessing interventions for tooth avulsion. When the healing of the PDL is unfavorable it means that there is no longer protection for the root from the surrounding alveolar bone. The bone that surrounds the tooth is continually undergoing physiological remodeling. Over time, the root is gradually replaced by bone, which leads to the loss of tooth root and so the crown of the tooth fractures.

The results of replanting permanent incisor teeth can be divided into short, medium and long-term survival of the tooth. If the tooth is replanted it acts in the short term to maintain space, maintain bone and provide good to excellent aesthetics. If unfavorable healing has occurred, the tooth can last into the medium term on 2-10+ years depending on the speed of bone turnover. Long-term survival of the tooth only happens when favorable healing of the periodontal ligament has occurred. If this happens the tooth can be estimated to survive as long as any other tooth

Epidemiology
Research has shown that more than five million teeth are knocked-out each year in the United States.  Dental avulsion is a type of dental trauma, and the prevalence of dental trauma is estimated at 17.5% and can vary due to the geographical area. Although dental trauma is relatively low, dental avulsion is the fourth most prevalent type of dental trauma.

Dental avulsion is more prevalent in males than females. Males are three times more likely to suffer from dental avulsion than females.

Up to 25% of school-aged children and military trainees and fighters experience some kind of dental trauma each year. The incidence of dental avulsion in school aged children ranges from 0.5 to 16% of all dental trauma. Many of these teeth are knocked-out during school activities or sporting events such as contact sports, football, basketball, and hockey. It is important for anyone whom is related, working, or witnessing sports that they be educated on this subject matter. Being educated could aid in minimizing injuries that could do further harm to the victim. Being informed and spreading awareness of dental avulsion in the state of knowledge, treatment, and prevention could make an impact.

History
The first reported cases of knocked-out teeth being replanted was by Pare in 1593. In 1706, Pierre Fauchard also reported replanting knocked out teeth. Wigoper in 1933 used a cast gold splint to hold reimplanted teeth in place. In 1959, Lenstrup and Skieller declared that the success rate of replanted knocked out teeth should be considered a temporary procedure because the success rate of less than 10% was so poor. In 1966 in a retrospective study, Andresen theorized that 90% of avulsed teeth could be successfully retained if they were replanted within the first 30 minutes of the accident. In 1974, Cvek showed that removal of the dental pulp following reimplantation was necessary to prevent resorption of the tooth root. In 1974, Cvek showed that storage of knocked out teeth in saline could improve the success of replanted teeth. In 1977, Lindskog et al. showed that the key to retention of the knocked-out teeth was to maintain the vitality of the periodontal ligament. In 1980, Blomlof showed that storing the periodontal ligament cells in a biocompatible medium could extend the extra oral time to four hours or more. He found that the best storage medium was a medical research fluid called Hank’s Balanced Solution. In this study, it was serendipitously discovered that milk could also maintain cell viability for two hours. In 1981, Andreasen showed that crushing of cells on the tooth root could cause death of the cells and lead to resorption and reduction in prognosis. In 1983, Matsson et al. showed that soaking in Hank’s Balanced Solution for thirty minutes prior to reimplantation could revitalize extracted dog’s teeth that were dry for 60 minutes. In 1989, a systematic storage device was developed to optimally store and preserve knocked out teeth. In 1992, Trope et al. showed that extracted dog’s teeth could be stored in Hank’s Balanced Solution for up to 96 hours and still maintain significant vitality. In this study, milk was only able to maintain vitality for two hours.

Archaeology
In ancient times, ritual dental avulsion was widespread among different cultures around the world. For example, it was common during the Early Holocene (from around 11,500 BP up to 5,000 BP) in North Africa and was occasionally observed in the Natufian culture (14,000 to 11,500 BP).

Such tooth avulsion was the intentional removal of one or more teeth, which was done for ritual or aesthetic reasons. It was also used to denote group affiliation. Typically, the maxillary incisors were the teeth most often selected for removal. This practice is still common in parts of Africa.

See also 

 Dental emergency
 Dental trauma

References

External links 

Acquired tooth disorders
Dentistry